"They'll Need a Crane" is a single and song by They Might Be Giants. In addition to vinyl and cassette releases, the single was released as a 3-inch CD. "They'll Need a Crane" was the first song the band performed on network television, in 1989 on Late Night with David Letterman.

Background
The song's lyrics focus on the breakup of a dysfunctional heterosexual relationship between a male "lad" and a female "gal". The band makes reference to the couple's respective flaws and make use of construction imagery to describe the relationship's degradation. The melancholic subject matter of the song is somewhat uncharacteristic for the band.

Music video
A music video for the single was directed by Adam Bernstein, a frequent collaborator of the band during their earlier years. It was filmed at the Bethesda terrace in Central park, New York City. The video primarily features the band playing with a group of elderly musicians, most notably jazz drummer Johnny Blowers who worked with Frank Sinatra during the 1940s.

Track listing
"They'll Need a Crane"
"It's Not My Birthday"
"I'll Sink Manhattan"
"Nightgown of the Sullen Moon"

References

External links
They'll Need a Crane EP at This Might Be A Wiki
"They'll Need a Crane" (song) at This Might Be A Wiki

Restless Records singles
1989 songs
They Might Be Giants songs
Songs written by John Linnell
Songs written by John Flansburgh